This is a list of heads of state of the Republic of Croatia, since the independence of Croatia.

Historically, the republican system was introduced in the Socialist Republic of Croatia while it was a constituent republic of the SFR Yugoslavia, and its head of state is discussed in the history of politics of the Socialist Republic of Croatia.

Since 1990, the President of the Republic of Croatia (Predsjednik) is directly elected to a five-year term and is limited to a maximum of two terms. However, with the Constitution of 2001, the powers of the President (much expanded in 1990) were now again severely curtailed, as Croatia shifted from a semi-presidential system, to an incomplete parliamentary system. As in most parliamentary systems, the President is now by-and-large a ceremonial office, with the Prime Minister de facto heading the executive branch.

Presidents of the Republic of Croatia (1990–present)
On 30 May 1990 Franjo Tuđman was elected by Parliament as the President of the Presidency of the Socialist Republic of Croatia, then still a constituent republic of the Socialist Federal Republic of Yugoslavia, and held office together with several Vice Presidents of the Presidency of SR Croatia. The collective presidency was reduced to seven members on 25 July 1990 and the name of the constituent Yugoslav republic was changed to the Republic of Croatia by removing the word Socialist from its name and the names of its institutions. The collective presidency was completely abolished in favor of the post of President of the Republic of Croatia with the adoption of a new constitution on 22 December 1990. The Croatian Parliament then declared independence on 25 June 1991, when Tuđman formally became the first president of an independent Croatian nation under the name the Republic of Croatia. Thus, the current office is not considered a continuation of the line of heads of state who held office while Croatia was a constituent republic in Yugoslavia, called SR Croatia (until 25 July 1990) and the Republic of Croatia (25 July-22 December 1990), and whose heads of state held a sub-national office.

(*)The constitutional amendments of November 2000 abandoned a semi-presidential system for a parliamentary system (with a directly elected president) and also made the presidency a non-partisan office, meaning that even if they are elected to office as a candidate of a particular political party, the president must resign membership in that party before taking office.

 (2)

 (2)

 (1)

A – Acting President
(**) From the abolishment of the collective Presidency of the Republic of Croatia on 22 December 1990

See also
Speaker of the Croatian Parliament
Prime Minister of Croatia
List of Croatian prime ministers by time in office
List of cabinets of Croatia
Speaker of the Chamber of Counties of Croatia
Secretary of the League of Communists of Croatia
List of heads of state of Yugoslavia
Prime Minister of Yugoslavia

References

Croatia

Presidents